Mum, Dad Meet Sam is a Nollywood movie about a Nigerian man who, after studying abroad, brought his English girlfriend home, which displeased his family.

References

Nigerian drama films